Samraat: The King Is Here is a 2016 Bangladeshi Bengali-language action crime thriller film directed by Mohammad Mostafa Kamal Raz and produced by Tiger Media Limited in association with Orkee Production and CINEMAWALA. The film features Shakib Khan, Apu Biswas, Indraneil Sengupta and Misha Sawdagor in lead roles. The first look teaser of the film was released on 6 August 2015 and official trailer released on 27 June 2016. The film narrates the fall of two notorious underworld mafia leaders. The film was released in Bangladesh on 7 July 2016.

Cast
 Shakib Khan as Samraat; The leader of a Bangladeshi organised crime syndicate operating from Malaysia.
 Apu Biswas as Ruhi; a doctor
 Indraneil Sengupta as Raja; an undercover police officer
 Misha Sawdagor as Musa
 Kabila as Kabila
 Shimul Khan as Rocket
 Subrata as Police Commissioner 
 DJ Shohel
 Emon as Rabbi (special appearance)

Production
The team began filming on 1 July 2015 at the BFDC in Dhaka, where the title song featuring Shakib Khan and Apu Biswas was shot in a set up by art director Samurai Maruf and choreographer Shibram Sarma. The team then set up base in Aftab Nagar & Uttara for a 14 days stint, with Indian actor Indraneil Sengupta, Misha Sawdagor and hundreds of extras and technicians gathered.

A second schedule continued throughout 14 August 2015 at Coke Studio in Dhaka, where a romantic song featuring Indraneil Sengupta and Apu Biswas was shot, after which it was reported that the film was 60 percent complete. By December 2015, it was reported that the film's shooting was completed and from December the post production was started.

Soundtrack

The soundtrack for Samraat is composed by Arfin Rumey, Imran Mahmudul, Savvy, and Dabbu. The soundtrack includes a total of 7 tracks, with 5 original tracks written by Johny Hoque, Robiul Islam Jibon, Zahid Hasan Abhi, Riddhi & Anup Kumar Biswas, with Arfin Rumey, Imran, Shadaab Hashmi, Konal & Satrujit Dasgupta as playback singers. Along with the 5 original tracks, the soundtrack also includes an unplugged version of "Dujone", as well as instrumental versions of "Dujone" and "Raatbhor". The official soundtrack was released on 1 December 2015.

References

External links
 First Look Teaser of Samraat: The King Is Here on YouTube
 Official Trailer of Samraat: The King Is Here on YouTube
 
 

2016 films
2010s action comedy-drama films
2010s romantic comedy-drama films
Bengali-language Bangladeshi films
Bangladeshi action comedy-drama films
Bangladeshi romantic comedy-drama films
Films scored by Arfin Rumey
Films scored by Dabbu
Films scored by Imran Mahmudul
Films scored by Savvy Gupta
2010s Bengali-language films
2016 comedy films
2016 drama films
Films about organised crime in Bangladesh